Trần Kim Phượng (5 November 1926 – 1 April 2004) was the last ambassador of the Republic of Vietnam to the United States.

Trần Kim Phượng was born on 5 November 1926 in Hanoi, French Indochina.

After the fall of Saigon on 30 April 1975, the South Vietnamese Embassy in the United States was closed on 21 May. After that Trần Kim Phượng lived in the United States until his death on 1 April 2004 in Maryland.

Family 
Trần Kim Phượng was married and had 2 children.

References 

Ambassadors of South Vietnam to the United States
1926 births
2004 deaths